Rebuilt: The Human Body Shop is a Discovery Health Channel reality television series featuring the Orthotic Prosthetic Center, a family-owned prosthetics lab in Fairfax, Virginia.

Plot 
Rebuilt: The Human Body Shop takes viewers into the world of orthotics and prosthetics.

Each episode features three people in the process of acquiring new limbs and the viewer is able to witness their emotional experiences.

Cast 

Elliot Weintrob as himself
Joan Weintrob as herself
Harry Weintrob as himself
Mark Latta as himself
Angela Boncz as herself

Series overview

Episodes

Series 1 (2006)

See also
Elliot Weintrob
Orthotic Prosthetic Center

References

External links 
Discovery Fit and Health

2000s American reality television series
Television shows set in Virginia
2006 American television series debuts
2000s American medical television series
Prosthetics
Discovery Health Channel original programming